Villages, formally village-level divisions in China, serve as a fundamental organizational unit for its rural population (census, mail system). Basic local divisions like neighborhoods and communities are not informal, but have defined boundaries and designated heads (one per area). In 2000, China's densely populated villages (>100 persons/square km) had a population greater than 500 million and covered more than 2 million square kilometers, or more than 20% of China's total area. By 2020, all incorporated villages (with proper conditions making it possible) had road access, the last village to be connected being a remote village in Sichuan province's Butuo County.

Types of villages

Urban
 Residential community
 Residential committees
 Residential groups (
Note Urban village one that spontaneously and naturally exists within urban area, which is not an administrative division.

Rural

 Administrative village or Village 
 Gacha only for Inner Mongolia.
  Ranch only for Qinghai.
 Ethnic village only for village populated by Ethnic minority.
 Village committees
 Villager groups
Note Natural village one that spontaneously and naturally exists within rural area, which is not an administrative division.

Lists of village-level divisions

Villages
List of villages in China

Provinces
List of village-level divisions of Anhui
List of village-level divisions of Fujian
List of village-level divisions of Gansu
List of village-level divisions of Guangdong
List of village-level divisions of Guizhou
List of village-level divisions of Hainan
List of village-level divisions of Hebei
List of village-level divisions of Heilongjiang
List of village-level divisions of Henan
List of village-level divisions of Hubei
List of village-level divisions of Hunan
List of village-level divisions of Jiangsu
List of village-level divisions of Jiangxi
List of village-level divisions of Jilin
List of village-level divisions of Liaoning
List of village-level divisions of Qinghai
List of village-level divisions of Shaanxi
List of village-level divisions of Shandong
List of village-level divisions of Shanxi
List of village-level divisions of Sichuan
List of village-level divisions of Yunnan
List of village-level divisions of Zhejiang
 Autonomous areas
List of village-level divisions of Guangxi
List of village-level divisions of Inner Mongolia
List of village-level divisions of Ningxia
List of village-level divisions of the Tibet Autonomous Region
List of village-level divisions of Xinjiang
Municipalities
List of village-level divisions of Beijing
List of village-level divisions of Chongqing
List of village-level divisions of Shanghai
List of village-level divisions of Tianjin

See also
 Ethnic villages of China
 Organic Law of Village Committees

References

Bibliography

External links
 Chinese Village Government Information Network
 Two Chinese Villages, Two Views of Rural Poverty
 Long-term changes in China's village landscapes are changing the world

Administrative divisions of China
 
Populated places in China